Nesah-ye Sofla (also Romanized as Nesah-ye Soflá; also known as Nesah-ye Mollā Ghaz̧anfar) is a village in Sepidar Rural District, in the Central District of Boyer-Ahmad County, Kohgiluyeh and Boyer-Ahmad Province, Iran. At the 2006 census, its population was 87, in 13 families.

References 

Populated places in Boyer-Ahmad County